The 2015 Copa Sudamericana was the 14th edition of the Copa Sudamericana, South America's secondary club football tournament organized by CONMEBOL.

Colombian team Santa Fe qualified to play in the 2016 Copa Libertadores, the 2016 Recopa Sudamericana, and the 2016 Suruga Bank Championship, after winning the final against Argentinian team Huracán 3–1 on penalties (0–0 on aggregate after extra time). River Plate were the defending champions, but were eliminated by Huracán in the semifinals.

Teams
The following 47 teams from the 10 CONMEBOL associations qualified for the tournament:
Title holders
Brazil: 8 berths
Argentina: 6 berths
All other associations: 4 berths each

The entry stage is determined as follows:
Round of 16: Title holders
Second stage: 14 teams (teams from Argentina and Brazil)
First stage: 32 teams (teams from all other associations)

Draw

The draw of the tournament was held on July 16, 2015, at the CONMEBOL Convention Centre in Luque, Paraguay.

For the first stage, the 32 teams were divided into two zones:
South Zone: The 16 teams from Bolivia, Chile, Paraguay, and Uruguay were drawn into eight ties.
North Zone: The 16 teams from Colombia, Ecuador, Peru, and Venezuela were drawn into eight ties.

Teams which qualified for berths 1 were drawn against teams which qualified for berths 4, and teams which qualified for berths 2 were drawn against teams which qualified for berths 3, with the former hosting the second leg in both cases. Teams from the same association could not be drawn into the same tie.

For the second stage, the 30 teams, including the 16 winners of the first stage (eight from South Zone, eight from North Zone), whose identity was not known at the time of the draw, and the 14 teams which entered the second stage, were divided into three sections:
Winners of the first stage: The 16 winners of the first stage were drawn into eight ties, with the order of legs decided by draw. Teams from the same association could be drawn into the same tie.
Brazil: The eight teams from Brazil were drawn into four ties. Teams which qualified for berths 1–4 were drawn against teams which qualified for berths 5–8, with the former hosting the second leg.
Argentina: The six teams from Argentina were drawn into three ties. Teams which qualified for berths 1–3 were drawn against teams which qualified for berths 4–6, with the former hosting the second leg.

Schedule
The schedule of the competition was as follows (all dates listed were Wednesdays, but matches could also be played on Tuesdays and Thursdays as well).

Notes

Elimination stages

In the elimination stages (first stage and second stage), each tie was played on a home-and-away two-legged basis. If tied on aggregate, the away goals rule was used. If still tied, the penalty shoot-out was used to determine the winner (no extra time was played). The 15 winners of the second stage (eight from winners of the first stage, four from Brazil, three from Argentina) advanced to the round of 16 to join the defending champions (River Plate).

First stage

Second stage

Final stages

In the final stages, the 16 teams played a single-elimination tournament, with the following rules:
Each tie was played on a home-and-away two-legged basis, with the higher-seeded team hosting the second leg.
In the round of 16, quarterfinals, and semifinals, if tied on aggregate, the away goals rule would be used. If still tied, the penalty shoot-out would be used to determine the winner (no extra time would be played).
In the finals, if tied on aggregate, the away goals rule would not be used, and 30 minutes of extra time would be played. If still tied after extra time, the penalty shoot-out would be used to determine the winner.
If there were two semifinalists from the same association, they would have to play each other.

The qualified teams were seeded in the final stages according to the draw of the tournament, with each team assigned a "seed" 1–16 by draw.

Bracket

Round of 16

Quarterfinals

Semifinals
Since there were two semifinalists from Argentina, they had to play each other instead of their original opponents as determined by the seeding.

Finals

The finals were played on a home-and-away two-legged basis, with the higher-seeded team hosting the second leg. If tied on aggregate, the away goals rule would not be used, and 30 minutes of extra time would be played. If still tied after extra time, the penalty shoot-out would be used to determine the winner.

Top goalscorers

See also
2015 Copa Libertadores
2016 Recopa Sudamericana
2016 Suruga Bank Championship

References

External links
Copa Sudamericana 2015, CONMEBOL.com 

 
2015
2